"Sad Eyes" is a song written and performed by Bruce Springsteen, recorded at Soundworks West in Los Angeles on January 25, 1990. The song was released as a single on the 1998 box set Tracks, as well as its 1999 single-disc version 18 Tracks.

Track listing
CD single (B00004UU3I)
"Sad Eyes"
"Missing"
"Man at the Top"
"Take 'Em as They Come"

Personnel 
Bruce Springsteen – lead vocals, guitar
Randy Jackson – bass
David Sancious – keyboards
Jeff Porcaro – drums

Charts

Enrique Iglesias version

Spanish singer-songwriter Enrique Iglesias recorded a version of "Sad Eyes" and included it on his first English language release, titled Enrique. While recording the album, Interscope chairman Jimmy Iovine, who had previously worked with Springsteen, found out that Iglesias was a fan of his (Iglesias often cites the Born in the U.S.A. tour as a favorite concert experience and Springsteen as his favorite performer) and urged him to record "Sad Eyes". The song was released as the fifth and final single from the album. The album version was not released to radio but rather the HQ2 remix which gave the song a more pop sound. Iglesias did not promote the song and it was not as successful as the previous singles from the album. However, the collected remixes charted high on the club play charts. A Spanish version of the song was also recorded titled "Más es amar".

Music video
A music video was shot, directed by David LaChapelle, but it was shelved at the time due to its sexual content. It depicts Iglesias alone in a motel room indulging erotic fantasies about a girl he sees in a phone-sex ad. In 2009, the video was uploaded to LaChappelle's website but was promptly removed at the request of Universal Music; it has since found its way to various video-sharing sites. The music video uses the HQ2 remix as opposed to the album version.

Track listings
Australia
 "Sad Eyes" (album version) – 4:08
 "Sad Eyes" (Rodney Jerkins mix) – 4:01
 "Sad Eyes" (Guy Roche mix) – 3:44
 "Sad Eyes" (HQ2 radio remix) – 3:34

America
 "Sad Eyes" (album version) – 4:08
 "Sad Eyes" (Rodney Jerkins Darkchild mix) – 4:01
 "Sad Eyes" (HQ2 club mix) – 9:29

Charts

Release history

References

1998 singles
1999 singles
2000 singles
Bruce Springsteen songs
Enrique Iglesias songs
Songs written by Bruce Springsteen
Pop ballads
Columbia Records singles
Music videos directed by David LaChapelle
1990 songs
Song recordings produced by Bruce Springsteen